The Alassalmi Ferry is a cable ferry linking Manamansalo island and mainland, across the Alassalmi strait on lake Oulujärvi, in Finland.

The ferry links the south-western coast of Manamansalo island with the west of lake Oulujärvi, on the municipality of Vaala in Kainuu, Finland.

The boat presently in service was designed in 1971 by Parkano company; she weighs , for a  draught.

She is operated by the FinFerries company.

References

External links 

 Alassalmi (finferries.fi)

Oulujärvi
Vaala
Ferries of Finland
Cable ferries